Medgyesegyháza is a town in Békés County, in the Southern Great Plain region of south-east Hungary.

Geography 
It covers an area of 64.32 km2 and has a population of 3558 people (2015).

History

The Jews in the city 
The Jewish community in the city was established in the second half of the 19th century and most of them were engaged in the grain trade.

The synagogue was built in 1870 and the community had a Jewish school.

In 1942, young Jews from the city were sent to forced labor and sent to the front of Ukraine, where the Hungarians fought alongside the Germans. Four townspeople were killed.

In 1944, after the Germans entered Hungary, all the local Jews were rounded up and finally transferred to Békéscsaba. Most of them were taken to the Auschwitz extermination camp.

After the war, 20 survivors returned to the town. The community was reorganized, but many dispersed within a short time.

Politics
The current mayor of Medgyesegyháza is Dr. Béla Nagy (Independent).

The local Municipal Assembly has 6+1 members divided into this political parties and alliances:

Twin towns – sister cities
Medgyesegyháza is twinned with:

  Kolárovo, Slovakia

References

External links

  in Hungarian

Populated places in Békés County
Slovak communities in Hungary
Shtetls
Jewish communities destroyed in the Holocaust